Congenital fiber type disproportion (CFTD) is an inherited form of myopathy with small type 1 muscle fibers that may occur in a number of neurological disorders.  It has a relatively good outcome and follows a stable course.  While the exact genetics is unclear, there is an association with mutations in the genes TPM3, ACTA1 and SEPN1.  It is a rare condition.

History
The condition was named by M. H. Brooke in 1973.

References

Congenital disorders